H-63 is a county-designated highway (CDH) in the Upper Peninsula of the US state of Michigan. The highway parallels the Interstate 75 (I-75) corridor between St. Ignace and Sault Ste. Marie. The road is called Mackinac Trail after the Upper Peninsula branch of an Indian trail used before European settlers reached the area. Originally, the roadway was built as a section of US Highway 2 (US 2) before being added to the CDH system in the 1970s.

H-63 serves as a two-lane alternative to the I-75 freeway across the eastern end of the Upper Peninsula. Between the northern side of St. Ignace, the roadway has connections to two state highways before running concurrently with M-48 near Rudyard. H-63 ends on the south side of Sault Ste. Marie.

Route description
H-63 starts a winding trail at Business Loop I-75 (BL I-75) north of St. Ignace in rural Mackinac County. From there, the highway heads northward towards the Kewadin Casino. The road then passes within viewing distance of I-75 past the Horseshoe Bay Wilderness. As it continues, H-63 has a connection to the southern terminus of M-123 with access to I-75 via a connecting road to M-123. After crossing to the west side of I-75, H-63 has access to I-75 via a connecting road to the western terminus of M-134. The CDH runs to the north and into Chippewa County. As it does so, H-63 turns away from I-75 as the latter curves northeastward.

From Rudyard northward,  H-63 turns northeasterly toward, and runs parallel to, I-75. At Kinross, there is an interchange between I-75 and M-80; H-63 has a brief concurrency with M-80 so that the latter can connect to all of the ramps in the interchange. The trail then crosses to the eastern side of I-75. Near Dafter, the CDH intersects M-28. Along this section, H-63 is roughly a half mile (0.8 km) away from the I-75 freeway at any given point as it continues northward to the Sault Ste. Marie area. H-63 terminates at its intersection with  Business Spur I-75 (BS I-75) on the south side of the city.

History
The first transportation route in the area was the Mackinac Trail, used by Native Americans before the Europeans arrived in the area; the trail in the area was the Upper Peninsula branch of a longer route that also connected the modern-day Saginaw with Mackinaw City and the Straits of Mackinac. Until 1933, no roadway was built along the path of the Indian trail. After that year, US 2 was rerouted between St. Ignace and Sault Ste. Marie using the modern routing of H-63. This placed the Mackinac Trail on the state trunkline highway system for the first time. In 1962 and 1963, the state transferred the highway to county control when US 2 was rerouted to follow the completed I-75 freeway. With the transfer to local control, Mackinac Trail became a county road. Later, it was given the  H-63 designation after October 5, 1970, as part of the County-Designated Highway System. The designation on the 1971 state map follows the routing used today.

Major intersections

See also

References

External links

H-63 at Michigan Highways

County-designated highways in Michigan
Transportation in Mackinac County, Michigan
Transportation in Chippewa County, Michigan
U.S. Route 2